The 2019 season was Southern Vipers' fourth season, in which they competed in the final edition of the Women's Cricket Super League, a Twenty20 competition. The side finished third in the initial group stage, winning 4 of their 10 matches, therefore progressing to the semi-final, where they beat Loughborough Lightning by 5 wickets. In the final they played against Western Storm, but lost to them by 7 wickets.

The side was captained by Tammy Beaumont and coached by Nicholas Denning. They played three home matches at the Rose Bowl and one home match apiece at the Arundel Castle Cricket Ground and the County Ground, Hove.

Squad
Southern Vipers announced a 15-player squad on 16 July 2019. Sophie Molineux was originally named in the squad, but withdrew due to injury and replaced by Amanda-Jade Wellington. Age given is at the start of Southern Vipers' first match of the season (6 August 2019).

Season standings

 Advanced to the Final.
 Advanced to the Semi-final.

League stage

Semi-final

Final

Statistics

Batting

Bowling

Fielding

Wicket-keeping

References

Southern Vipers seasons
2019 in English women's cricket